Nazım Ekren (born December 4, 1956 in Istanbul) was a Deputy Prime Minister of Turkey responsible for economic affairs.

Political career
He was appointed to his position in August 2007, succeeding Abdüllatif Şener. Ekren is a former professor of banking and international finance.

Ekren graduated in economics from the Bursa Academy of Economics and Finance (Iktisadi ve Ticari Ilimler Akdemisi), and then received a Master's degree and PhD from Uludağ University in Bursa, going on to a career as an academic in the field of economics at Marmara University in Istanbul.

Ekren was a founding member of Tayyip Erdoğan's Justice and Development Party (AKP). He was elected to the parliament in 2007 as deputy of Istanbul Province.

Nazım Ekren was appointed Deputy Prime Minister, responsible for coordinating economic affairs and for the management of:
 State Planning Organization (Turkey) (DPT)
 Turkish Statistical Institute (DİE)
 Southeastern Anatolia Project (GAP) for regional development.

Ekren was also responsible for relations with:
 the state-owned banks: Ziraat Bank, Halkbank, Türkiye Kalkınma Bankası, and Financial Markets Board (SPK). 
 Board of Banking Control and Inspection
 Saving Deposit Insurance Fund (TMSF)

References

External links
 Grand National Assembly official website 

Turkish non-fiction writers
Turkish economists
Bursa Uludağ University alumni
Academic staff of Marmara University
Deputy Prime Ministers of Turkey
1956 births
Living people
Politicians from Istanbul
Turkish people of Circassian descent
Justice and Development Party (Turkey) politicians
Imam Hatip school alumni
Deputies of Istanbul
Members of the 23rd Parliament of Turkey
Members of the 22nd Parliament of Turkey
Ministers of State of Turkey
Members of the 60th government of Turkey